Selaginella moellendorffii is a lycophyte that is an important model organism, especially in comparative genomics. S. moellendorffii is a member of an ancient vascular plant lineage that first appeared in the fossil record some 400 million years ago. They would later form a dominant part of the world's flora during the Carboniferous period. They have a number of unusual and/or "primitive" features, such as rudimentary leaves (microphylls), ubiquitous dichotomous branching, heterospory, and the ligule. As the earliest diverging group of modern vascular plants, they are essential to understanding the evolution of plants as a whole.

Genome sequencing 
The nuclear genome size is approximately 100 mega base pairs, one of the smaller genome sizes found for any plant species. The genome has been sequenced and assembled by the United States Department of Energy's Joint Genome Institute (DOE JGI). Community annotation of the genes and other elements of this genome began in September 2007. Gene content of S. moellendorffii and diverse other taxa have showed that the transition from gametophyte- to sporophyte- dominated life cycle entailed the addition of fewer new genes than the move from nonseed vascular plants (lycophytes) to flowering plants (angiosperms).

Hecht et al., 2011 finds that S. moellendorffii has the highest guanine + cytosine content of any organellar DNA. Its mitochondrial DNA is 68% G+C; both are typically rare components of any organellar DNA.

References

External links 
 American Society for Plant Biology Selaginella education page
 Selaginella genomics website - contribute to the genome annotation
 Purdue University's Selaginella Wiki

moellendorffii